We Come Strapped is the debut studio album by American rapper MC Eiht and the fourth album by his group Compton's Most Wanted. It was released on July 19, 1994 through Epic Street. Recording sessions took place at X-Factor Studios in Long Beach, California. Production was handled primarily by Compton's Most Wanted members MC Eiht and DJ Slip, except for one song, "Compton Bomb", produced by Ric Roc. It features contributions from William "Willie Z" Zimmerman on the keyboards, Josh Achziger on guitar, Carla Evans on vocals, and guest appearances from rappers Redman and Spice 1.

The album peaked at number 5 on the Billboard 200 and at number 1 on the Top R&B/Hip-Hop Albums chart in the United States, and was certified gold by the Recording Industry Association of America on September 29, 1994. It has been MC Eiht's most successful album to date.

It spawned two singles and music videos for the songs "All for the Money" and "Geez Make the Hood Go Round".

Background
Despite the CMW title on the album cover, We Come Strapped is considered to be MC Eiht's debut solo album. In addition to MC Eiht, from CMW, the album features DJ Slip on keyboards and production, as well as DJ Mike T's scratches in one song only. However, MC Eiht mentions the fellow group members by name-dropping Boom Bam, Tha Chill, Lil Hawk & Bird, and Niggaz on tha Run throughout the album. The rapper insults DJ Quik on the track "Def Wish III" due to their then-ongoing feud.

Track listing

Sample credits
"All for the Money" contains a sample of "In the Mood" performed by Tyrone Davis.

Personnel
Aaron Tyler – main artist, vocals, keyboards (tracks: 1, 2), producer (tracks: 1-13, 15), co-producer (track 14), arranger, executive producer
Terry Keith Allen – main artist, keyboards (tracks: 6, 14), producer (tracks: 1-13, 15), co-producer (track 14), arranger, engineering
Michael Bryant – scratches (track 6)
Reginald Noble – featured artist, vocals (track 12)
Robert L. Green Jr. – featured artist, vocals (track 12)
Carla Evans – vocals (track 3)
William "Willie Z" Zimmerman – keyboards (tracks: 1-5, 7-13, 15), co-arranger
Josh Achziger – guitar (track 14), assistant engineering
Alaric "Rick" Simon – producer (track 14)
Alan Yoshida – mastering
Cheryl Dickerson – A&R direction
Peter Dokus – art direction, photography
Rom Anthonis – design
John W. Smith – management

Charts

Certifications

See also
List of number-one R&B albums of 1994 (U.S.)

References

External links 

MC Eiht albums
Compton's Most Wanted albums
1994 debut albums
Epic Records albums
Albums produced by MC Eiht